The 1986 Prize of Moscow News was the 21st edition of an international figure skating competition organized in Moscow, Soviet Union. It was held December 3–7, 1986. Medals were awarded in the disciplines of men's singles, ladies' singles, pair skating and ice dancing. The Soviet Union swept three podiums. The men's title went to European silver medalist Vladimir Kotin. Olympic bronze medalist Kira Ivanova won the ladies' category ahead of Jill Trenary from the United States. Marina Klimova / Sergei Ponomarenko, also Olympic bronze medalists, took the ice dancing title.

Men

Ladies

Pairs

Ice dancing

References

1986 in figure skating
Prize of Moscow News